Drumcarban is a townland in County Cavan, Ireland, in the electoral division of the same name. The townland lies west of the R154 regional road. Neighbouring townlands are (clockwise, starting in the north): Cornamucklagh, Newtown, Drumbar, Coolnacarrick, Legaweel, Legaginny, Lackan Lower, and Drumcrow. On the boundary with the latter lies White Lough.

References

Townlands of County Cavan